Jean-Baptiste Moreau was first minister at St. John's Anglican Church (Lunenburg) (1753-1770) and one of the founding fathers of the community. He was one of two missionaries who first arrived in Halifax with Edward Cornwallis (1749) and served at St. Paul's Church (Halifax).  His wife had the first child born in Halifax and was named Cornwallis after the Governor. Then in 1753 he was sent to help establish Lunenburg, Nova Scotia. Rev Moreau served the community throughout the French and Indian War. He reported to Society for Propagation of the Gospel (SPG) in London, "…the number massacred by Indians in Lunenburg District during the War was 32."  He learned the Mi'kmaw language and is reported to have baptised a number of Mi'kmaq children.  He is buried in the crypt of St. John's Anglican Church

See also 
Dettlieb Christopher Jessen 
John Creighton (judge)
Patrick Sutherland
Sebastian Zouberbuhler

References 

Canadian Anglican priests
History of Nova Scotia